The  is a railway line in Japan, operated by the East Japan Railway Company (JR East). It connects Kogota Station in Misato, Miyagi Prefecture to Shinjō Station in Shinjō, Yamagata Prefecture, acting as a connector between the Tōhoku Main Line, Ōu Main Line, and Tōhoku Shinkansen in the southern Tōhoku region, and provides access to north-western Miyagi Prefecture and north-eastern Yamagata Prefecture.

Its name refers to the ancient provinces of Mutsu (陸奥) and Dewa (出羽) (or alternatively, the Meiji period provinces of Rikuzen (陸前) and Uzen (羽前)), which the line connects.

History
The Kogota - Naruko-Onsen section was opened in stages between 1913 and 1915, with the Shinjo - Naruko-Onsen section opened in stages between 1915 and 1917.

CTC signalling was commissioned in 1983, and freight services ceased in 1987.

The line celebrated its 100th anniversary on November 3, 2017, with a special train hauled by JNR Class DE10 locomotives.

Former connecting lines
 Nishi-Furukawa station - A  narrow gauge line ultimately extending  to Tori-Machi, and connecting to the Senzan Line at Toshogu station, was opened by the Sendai City Council between 1922 and 1929. It closed in sections between 1937 and 1960.

Station list

Symbols:
 ｜ - Single-track
 ◇ - Single-track; station where trains can pass
 ∨ - Single-track section starts from this point

Rolling stock

 KiHa 110 series DMUs

Past
 Resort Minori

References

External links

Resort Minori - JR East (Wayback Machine)

 
Lines of East Japan Railway Company
Rail transport in Yamagata Prefecture
Rail transport in Miyagi Prefecture
1067 mm gauge railways in Japan
Railway lines opened in 1913
1913 establishments in Japan